was a town located in Minamiuwa District, Ehime Prefecture, Japan.

As of 2004, the town of Jōhen had an estimated population of 9,751 and a density of 129.37 persons per km². The total area was 75.37 km².

On October 1, 2004, Jōhen, along with the towns of Ipponmatsu, Mishō and Nishiumi, and the village of Uchiumi (all from Minamiuwa District), was merged to create the town of Ainan.

External links
Official website of Ainan in Japanese

Dissolved municipalities of Ehime Prefecture
Ainan, Ehime